Dust Mohammad-e Shah Gol Pahlavan (also Romanized as Dūst Moḩammad-e Shāh Gol Pahlavān) is a village in Margan Rural District, in the Central District of Hirmand County, Sistan and Baluchestan Province, Iran. At the 2006 census, its population was 68, in 15 families.

References 

Populated places in Hirmand County